Tamchakett is a town and commune in the Hodh El Gharbi Region of south-central Mauritania.

Transport
The town is served by Tamchakett Airport.

Communes of Mauritania